Universiti Utara Malaysia (literally meaning Northern University of Malaysia, abbreviated as UUM) is a management university established on 16 February 1984 under the Universiti Utara Malaysia 1984 Order. It has a main campus in Sintok, Kedah and also a branch campus in Kuala Lumpur. UUM was ranked 481 in the QS World University Rankings 2023.

History

The construction planning began in August 1983 when the Ministry of Education began to plan the university. On 19 October 1983, the Cabinet gave its approval for this project in Kedah. At that time, the project was called "The Sixth University Project". Several months later, the temporary office of the Sixth University, officially named Universiti Utara Malaysia (UUM), was officially opened on 15 February 1984 in Jitra.

Four months after its official opening, the UUM office was relocated to the provisional Darul Aman Campus in Jitra, in June 1984, when the first phase of the project had been completed. The first academic year began in June 1984. The Darul Aman Campus was on a 62-acre tract of land in Bandar Darulaman. It was 18 km north of Alor Setar and 4.8 km from Jitra.

Meanwhile, the planning of a permanent campus had begun. It was to be built on an area of 1,061 hectares in Sintok (in the district of Kubang Pasu), 48 km north of Alor Setar and 10 km east of Changlun, a small town along the North-South Highway, near the Malaysia-Thai border.

The permanent UUM campus, referred to as the Sintok Campus, began operations on 15 September 1990. In a former tin mining area, it is in a valley of lush tropical forests, embraced by blue hills, and watered by two rivers that flow along the middle of the campus. The rivers are Sungai Sintok and Sungai Badak.

The MYR580 million Sintok Campus was opened on 17 February 2004 by the Royal Chancellor, His Royal Highness Sultan Abdul Halim Mu’adzam Shah. The main buildings are the Sultanah Bahiyah Library, the Chancellery (present-day Sultan Sallehudin Chancellery), the Sultan Badlishah Mosque, the Mu’adzam Shah Hall, the Tan Sri Othman Hall, the Sports Complex, the Varsity Mall, the Budi Siswa building, the Convention Complex, and the buildings that house the departments of the academic colleges.

In January 2008, a restructuring of the university academic system was undertaken. Thirteen faculties were merged and streamed into three main academic colleges: UUM COB (UUM College of Business), UUM CAS (UUM College of Arts and Sciences), and UUM COLGIS (UUM College of Law, Government and International Studies).

Campuses

Sintok Campus
The main campus is on a  site in Sintok, Kedah. The campus is 48 km north of Alor Setar and 10 km south of the Bukit Kayu Hitam and are near the Malaysia-Thailand border. Other towns near UUM are Jitra and Changlun.

Due to its vast land area, the university has used 107 hectares of forest to develop facilities open for use by outsiders. Thus the campus has evolved into an open campus where outsiders and tourists visit. Among the facilities are a picnic area, a deer farm, a nine-hole golf course, a go-kart circuit, a shooting and archery range, and an equestrian site.

The training base and facilities for the Malaysian National Service Programme (PLKN) was on the campus.

Kuala Lumpur Campus
UUMKL Campus is the first UUM fully owned study centre outside Sintok and operated directly by UUM. It is a non-residential campus which occupies a nine-storey building in the city center along Jalan Raja Muda Abdul Aziz in the Kampung Baru area and adjacent to Chow Kit.

Academics

College of Business
Initially, the business and management courses were delivered under a faculty system. In 2008, the faculties were merged to form the College of Business. The curriculum includes business administration, accountancy, finance, economics, banking, marketing, human resource management, insurance and risk management, Islamic banking and finance, muamalat, operations management, and technology management. In the building of Tunku Puteri Intan Safinaz School of Accountancy lies a well known hipster cafe called He and She Coffee.

Schools
 Graduate School: Othman Yeop Abdullah Graduate School of Business (OYAGSB)
 School of Business Management
 Islamic Business School
 Tunku Puteri Intan Safinaz School of Accountancy
 School of Economics, Finance & Banking
 School of Technology Management & Logistics
UUM National Golf Academy

College of Arts and Sciences
The College of Arts and Sciences (UUM CAS) was formed on 1 January 2008. UUM CAS consists of five academic divisions – Applied Sciences, Educational Studies, Humanities, Physical Sciences, and Social Sciences – and each is headed by a chairperson.

Under the umbrella of UUM CAS, the Applied Sciences division caters for the cross-disciplinary programmes of IT, Computer Science, Multimedia and Decision Science programmes. Research interests include algorithms, web and mobile, software engineering, computer networking, intelligent and information systems, knowledge management, and decision analysis.

Physical Sciences focuses on statistics and mathematics with research interests spanning across the field of statistics and mathematics.

The Humanities and Social Sciences division explores the human condition to better understand our roots, our belief and the best way to express ourselves. The discipline includes history, nationhood, religion, language, communication and media technology.

The Education division produces future educators.

Schools
 Graduate School: Awang Had Salleh Graduate School of Arts and Sciences
 School of Computing
 School of Education
 School of Multimedia Technology & Communication
 School of Quantitative Sciences
 School of Applied Psychology, Social Work and Policy

College of Law, Government and International Studies
The Faculty of Public Management and Law (FPAU) was established on 16 November 2003 consisting of three departments: Public Management; Development Management; and Law. Since its inception, FPAU has offered three academic programs at the undergraduate level with honours and six programs at the postgraduate level. In 2008, the faculties was restructured and grouped under the College of Law, Government and International Studies (COLGIS).

Schools
 Graduate School: Ghazali Shafie Graduate School of Government
 School of Government
 School of Law
 School of International Studies
 School of Tourism, Hospitality & Event Management
School of Creative Industry Management & Performing Arts

Facilities

Student Residential Halls (Inapan Siswa) 
The university houses 15 residential halls (13 in-campus, 2 off-campus in Kachi), each divided by four lanes A, B, C and D (Informally named after bus routes). Many residential halls have their own basic facilities, such as a food court, student lounge and laundry services. Currently Petronas Student Residential Hall and TM Student Residential Hall (UUM labels their residential halls by names of corporations, initially via numbering system) are designated as disabled-friendly Student Residential Halls with several purposely-modified rooms. The residential hall administration and Student Development and Leadership Committee (Jawatankuasa Pembangunan dan Kepimpinan Siswa, JKPS) were initially separate for each residential halls, but later merged among two administrations each with the exception of the residential halls in Kachi area. There are several residential halls that are reserved for students who take particular courses, based on accessibility.

Route A 
 Tradewinds Student Residential Hall
 Proton Student Residential Hall
 TNB Student Residential Hall
 MAS Student Residential Hall (all-female hostel)

Route B 
 Petronas Student Residential Hall
 Sime Darby Student Residential Hall (all-female hostel)
 Grantt Student Residential Hall (Formerly EON Student Residential Hall)
 TM Student Residential Hall
 BSN Student Residential Hall (formerly Perwaja College, all-female hostel)
 MISC Student Residential Hall

Route C 
 Yayasan Al-Bukhary Student Residential Hall
 Bank Muamalat Student Residential Hall (all-female hostel)

Route D (Kachi) 
 Bank Rakyat Student Residential Hall
 SME Bank Student Residential Hall

Others 
Maybank Student Residential Hall (apartment)
Persisiran Naib Canselor
Persisiran Sintok
Taman Universiti (off-campus)

Museums and Galleries 

 UUM Management Museum
 Tun Dr. Mahathir Mohamad Gallery (Located in the new block of Sultanah Bahiyah Library)

Libraries 

 Sultanah Bahiyah Library

List of Universiti Utara Malaysia people
This is a list of notable people associated with the Universiti Utara Malaysia in Sintok, Kedah. This list includes both alumni and faculty members.
 Kabiru Maitama Kura - Associate Professor of Business Management
 Ramatu Abdulareem Abubakar - Ahamdu Bello University Zaria, Nigeria
 Abdu Jaafaru Bambale - Professor at Bayero University Kano, Nigeria

Rankings

See also
 List of universities in Malaysia
 Education in Malaysia

References

External links 

 

Kubang Pasu District
Universities and colleges in Kedah
Public universities in Malaysia
Business schools in Malaysia
Educational institutions established in 1984
Northern Corridor Economic Region
Law schools in Malaysia
1984 establishments in Malaysia